Rimu can mean the following:
Dacrydium cupressinum, also rimu, a tree endemic to New Zealand
Rimu (algae), a general term for seaweeds in Polynesia
Rimu, Southland, a locality in Southland, New Zealand
Rimu, West Coast, a locality in the West Coast region of New Zealand
Rimu, in Polynesian mythology, a god of the dead